Sperm-specific antigen 2 is a protein that in humans is encoded by the SSFA2 gene.

References

Further reading